Robert Harrison is the name of:

Politics
Robert Harrison (Brownist) (died 1585), English Protestant Separatist
Robert Alexander Harrison (1833–1878), Ontario lawyer, judge, and political figure
Robert Dinsmore Harrison (1897–1977), U.S. Representative from Nebraska
Robert Leslie Harrison (1903–1966), Australian dairy farmer and Queensland Legislative Assemblyman
Bob Harrison (Australian politician) (born 1934), member of the New South Wales Legislative Assembly
Robbie Harrison, Canadian politician

Sports
Robert Harrison (footballer) (1911–1950), Scottish footballer
Robert Harrison (born 1973). President of the Paraguayan Football Association
Bob Harrison (American football) (1937–2016), American defensive lineman in the National Football League
Bob Harrison (American football coach) (1941–2022), American football coach
Bob Harrison (baseball) (born 1930), American baseball player
Bob Harrison (basketball) (born 1927), basketball player
Bob Harrison (speedway rider) (1906–1964), international speedway rider

Other
Robert Harrison (financier), American lawyer, banker
Robert Harrison (publisher) (1904–1978), publisher of Confidential magazine
Robert Harrison (surgeon) (1796–1858), president of the Royal College of Surgeons in Ireland
Robert H. Harrison (1745–1790), American jurist
Robert J. Harrison (born 1960), computational chemist
Robert Pogue Harrison (born 1954), professor of Italian literature at Stanford University
Bobby Harrison (born 1939), drummer for Procol Harum

See also
Rob Harrison (disambiguation)
 Harrison (name)